Mike Cavanaugh is an American ice hockey coach and former player. Cavanaugh was an assistant at Boston College for 18 seasons before being named as Bruce Marshall's successor at Connecticut in the spring of 2013.

Head coaching record

References

External links
 Official Biography, UConn Huskies

1968 births
Living people
Bowdoin Polar Bears men's ice hockey players
UConn Huskies men's ice hockey coaches
People from North Andover, Massachusetts
Ice hockey coaches from Massachusetts
Pittsburgh Phantoms (RHI) players
Sportspeople from Essex County, Massachusetts
Ice hockey players from Massachusetts